The 1998 Marlboro 500 Presented by Toyota was the nineteenth and final time of the 1998 CART FedEx Championship Series season.  The race was held 1 November 1998, and was the 2nd running of the Marlboro 500 at California Speedway. It was won by Jimmy Vasser who passed Greg Moore at a final lap restart of a long race, which took well over 3 hours and also had many retirements. This marks the final Champ Car race for the 3-Time Champion Bobby Rahal.

Qualifying results

Classification

Race

Caution flags

Lap Leaders

Point standings after race

References 

Marlboro 500
MAVTV 500
Marlboro 500 Presented by Toyota
Marlboro 500 Presented by Toyota